La Salle High School is a private, Roman Catholic high school in Union Gap, Washington. It is the only Catholic high school in the Roman Catholic Diocese of Yakima. The school's motto, Signum Fidei (Sign of Faith), is shared with other Lasallian schools around the world.

Background
La Salle High School of Yakima is a Catholic Lasallian college-preparatory high school. The school's pedagogy is based on the teachings St. John Baptist de La Salle who founded the first Lasallian school in Reims, France in 1685.

La Salle High School was opened in 1998 to replace Carroll High School, which had closed in the late 1980s. The school is sponsored and administered by the De La Salle Christian Brothers. It is also a member of the Brothers' District of San Francisco New Orleans, headquartered at Mont La Salle in Napa, California. A group of committed Catholic parents and then-Bishop of Yakima, Cardinal Francis George, worked to found the high school. The support of parents from the school community continues to be instrumental in the school's growth and the fulfillment of its mission.

Academics
All students at La Salle take a college preparatory course of studies. La Salle High School partners with the University of Washington and Grand Canyon University to offer dual enrollment courses in several academic departments. Additionally, a number of AP and Honors courses are offered. Students earn SAT and ACT scores well above the national average. The class of 2017 numbered 61 and received scholarship and aid offers totaling 5.5 million dollars.

Faith
La Salle is a Catholic High School in the Lasallian tradition. The association of Lasallian schools is in more than 80 countries, with one million students enrolled. Students at Lasallian schools gather regularly for prayer and Mass (liturgy of Catholicism), and are encouraged to participate in campus ministry activities. All students participate in the four-year religious studies curriculum. Lasallian educational institutions are mandated to be of service of those in need in the community. For Lasallians, this is an expression of their values.

Students at La Salle High School may participate in weekly service projects to those in need in the area. Four service "immersion trips" are offered annually, which expand service-giving opportunities and provide social justice issues education to students. These trips include: serving homeless people in Seattle; working with children on the Blackfeet Indian Reservation in Montana; serving the urban poor of Rochester, New York; assisting impoverished residents of the Yakama Nation who are in need of home repair and improvement; and, in summer, to Mexico, to serve marginalized children there.

Athletics
Since the school was founded in 1998, La Salle has won four team State Championships and many tennis, golf, and track individual State Championships. Home to the La Salle Lightning, the school offers cheer, football, soccer, volleyball, cross country, basketball, track, tennis, golf, baseball, boys soccer and softball teams. In 2010 La Salle opted up to the 1A classification and currently competes in the South Central Athletic Conference (SCAC) athletic league.

In the 2018–2019 school year, La Salle won both the 1A Girls' Soccer State Championship and the 1A Girls' Basketball State Championship.

Student life

ASB
La Salle activities offered throughout the year include Dances, Homecoming, Prom, weekly video announcements, lunchtime intramurals, and rallies.

Campus Ministry
Alongside the Director of Campus Ministry and adult chaperones, student campus ministers organize activities to nurture and promote the spiritual development of students. After school community service, extended service immersion trips, class retreats, all school prayer services and masses and justice education activities are among the programs led by Campus Ministry.

Campus
La Salle has been developing its master plan since moving to the Union Gap campus in 2000. The academic buildings include Roy Hall, Lightning Hall, the Gamache Science Center and several temporary classrooms where future buildings will be built. At the center of campus is the Gamache Chapel of Saint John Baptist de La Salle. On the back of a chapel is a stage which opens up to a large outdoor amphitheater which holds many of the school's celebrations including graduation. The forty acre campus includes a soccer, baseball, fastpitch, practice football field and large gymnasium, as well as a number of tennis courts and a weight lifting facility. On far end of campus near the Ahtanum Creek, La Salle has built a full service fish hatchery in cooperation with the Yakama Nation. The hatchery is completely managed by La Salle students and teachers and is helping to re-establish important salmon runs on this area of the watershed. Nearby the hatchery students operate beehives that produce Lightning Honey each year and serve as a resource for scientific study.

Most recently the school's student center and gymnasium have been completed. Additional building plans include a classroom building, visual and performing art center, media tech center, administration building and football stadium.

External links
 School Website

Notes and references

Roman Catholic Diocese of Yakima
High schools in Yakima County, Washington
Catholic secondary schools in Washington (state)
Lasallian schools in the United States
Educational institutions established in 1998
1998 establishments in Washington (state)